Babina Greda is a village and a municipality in Vukovar-Syrmia County in eastern Croatia. The 2011 census listed 3,572 inhabitants in Babina Greda. With pronounced issue of population decline in eastern Croatia caused by population ageing, effects of the Croatian War of Independence and post 2013 enlargement of the European Union emigration, the population of the municipality at the time of 2021 census dropped to 2,762.

References

External links
 

Populated places in Vukovar-Syrmia County
Municipalities of Croatia
Populated places in Syrmia